This is a list of Internet exchange points (IXPs).  There are several sources for IXP locations, including Packet Clearing House, who have maintained the earliest list of IXPs, with global coverage since 1994. Also, Telegeography, PeeringDB and the Network Startup Resource Center.  Additionally, there are Internet exchange point associations that publish lists of member IXPs.  Some of the Internet exchange point associations are loosely grouped into the Internet Exchange Point Federation.

For more information on the largest IXPs, see list of Internet exchange points by size.

Introduction
The columns used in the lists below include the following information:
 Region: The official Regional Internet registry (RIR) regions.
 Country: Uses ISO 3166-1 alpha-3 to display the country flag.
 City: A reference to a city article within Wikipedia.
 Name: Longname (Shortname). Entries flagged with an asterisk (*) do not appear in PeeringDB.
 IX-F region: IX-F region with which the IXP is associated.

Active Internet exchanges 
The IXPs in this list have a working webpage, are listed in PeeringDB, or both.

Inactive Internet exchanges

The IXPs in the list that follows do not have a working webpage or a record in the PeeringDB.

References

External links
PeeringDB

Internet-related lists